Emil Newman (January 20, 1911 – August 30, 1984) was an American music director and conductor who worked on more than 200 films and TV series. He was nominated for an Oscar for his musical direction on the classic Sun Valley Serenade (1941), contributing to the Newmans being the most nominated Academy Award extended family, with a collective 95 nominations in various music categories.

Biography
A native of Connecticut, Newman entered films in 1940 as the musical director on 13 films. He was credited on 25 films in 1941 and 28 in 1942, one of which, Whispering Ghosts, contained his first (uncredited) contribution as a composer. He had 15 titles in 1943, including "Musical Direction" for the all-black musical Stormy Weather and the 20th Century Fox wartime film Chetniks! The Fighting Guerrillas, 19 in 1944, 17 in 1945 and 16 in 1946, including Hugo Friedhofer's Academy Award score for The Best Years of Our Lives, which he also conducted. Between 1950 and 1965, Newman was the composer on 23 films, most of which were lower-budget B movies, although they also included prestigious pictures such as Hondo (1953). He also provided the music for numerous 1950s TV shows.

Newman died in Woodland Hills, a suburb of Los Angeles. He is interred at Forest Lawn Memorial Park in Glendale, California.

Family connections, marriage and children
Emil Newman's older brother was renowned film composer Alfred Newman (1901–1970), whose children Maria, David and Thomas are also composers. His younger brother was another famous film composer, Lionel Newman (1916–1989), whose grandson Joey Newman is a film and TV composer. Another brother, Irving, was the father of still another acclaimed film musical personality, songwriter and composer Randy Newman. His brother Marc Newman was a film agent representing some of Hollywoods most noted composers including John Williams, Jerry Goldsmith, Dave Grusin and Marvin Hamlisch.  His brother Robert V. Newman was a studio executive and former President of John Wayne's Batjac Productions. Their family is of Jewish descent.

Newman was married to bit-part actress Eva May Hoffman aka Eve Farrell. They had two children, daughter Arleen (born 1939) and son William Robert (born August 14, 1937).

William Robert Newman is the father of Jill Newman, Sarah Devries, William Marcus and Jaice Newman. The offspring of Arleen Newman and Dennis Crosby (son of Bing Crosby) are Erin Colleen Crosby and Kelly Lee Crosby. Dennis also adopted Katherine Denise Buelle, Arleen's daughter by her first husband Mike Buelle.

Selected filmography

References

External links

1911 births
1984 deaths
Musicians from New Haven, Connecticut
Jewish American film score composers
Emil
20th-century American composers
American music arrangers
American film score composers
American male conductors (music)
Burials at Forest Lawn Memorial Park (Glendale)
20th-century American conductors (music)
American male film score composers
20th-century American male musicians
20th Century Studios people